Damaso Munoz (born July 10, 1986) is a retired American gridiron football linebacker. He played college football for Rutgers. After spending 2010 training camp with the Chicago Bears,he played for the Edmonton Eskimos of the Canadian Football League from 2011 to 2013. He signed with the Buccaneers on February 19, 2014. He signed with the Ottawa Redblacks  on September 15, 2014.

Playing career
After his college career at Rutgers, Muñoz had a tryout with the Chicago Bears as an undrafted free agent in 2010. He never got a contract, so he went north to the CFL. He played six seasons in the Canadian Football League, playing with the Edmonton Eskimos and Ottawa Redblacks. In between his time with the Eskimos and the Redblacks, he went back to the NFL playing for Tampa Bay in training camp, however once again he didn’t make the roster. He served a captain for the Redblacks in 2016 and in 2015 earned the team’s defensive player of the year.

References

External links
Tampa Bay Buccaneers bio
Ottawa Redblacks bio

1986 births
Living people
American football linebackers
Canadian football linebackers
Edmonton Elks players
Ottawa Redblacks players
Players of American football from Miami
Rutgers Scarlet Knights football players
Rutgers Scarlet Knights football coaches
Tampa Bay Buccaneers players
Players of American football from New York (state)
Sports coaches from Miami
Players of Canadian football from Miami